The index of physics articles is split into multiple pages due to its size.

To navigate by individual letter use the table of contents below.

H

H-1NF
H-alpha
H-stable potential
H-theorem
H. Dieter Zeh
H. Eugene Stanley
H. J. Round
H. Jay Melosh
H. Pierre Noyes
H. Richard Crane
H. Stanley Allen
H1 (particle detector)
HEPnet
HERA-B
HERMES experiment
HITRAP
HLX-1
HT-7
High-temperature engineering test reactor
Haag's theorem
Haag–Lopuszanski–Sohnius theorem
Hadamard–Rybczynski equation
Hadron
Hadron Elektron Ring Anlage
Hadron epoch
Hadron spectroscopy
Hadronization
Hafele–Keating experiment
Hafnium controversy
Hagedorn temperature
Hagen Kleinert
Hagen–Poiseuille equation
Hagen–Poiseuille flow from the Navier–Stokes equations
Haidinger fringe
Haim Harari
Hajo Meyer
Hal Anger
Halbach array
Halden Boiling Water Reactor
Halden Reactor
Half-life
Half-metal
Half-value layer
Half time (physics)
Hall effect
Hall effect sensor
Hall effect thruster
Hall probe
Halo (optical phenomenon)
Halo Occupation Distribution
Halo nucleus
Halothermal circulation
Halpin–Tsai model
Halton Arp
Hamilton's principal function
Hamilton's principle
Hamiltonian (quantum mechanics)
Hamiltonian constraint
Hamiltonian fluid mechanics
Hamiltonian lattice gauge theory
Hamiltonian mechanics
Hamiltonian system
Hamiltonian vector field
Hamilton–Jacobi equation
Hammar experiment
Hampson–Linde cycle
Hanany–Witten transition
Hanbury Brown and Twiss effect
Hand boiler
Handbook of Porphyrin Science
Hang gliding
Hanna Nasser (academic)
Hannay angle
Hannes Alfvén
Hannes Alfvén Prize
Hanns Hörbiger
Hannspeter Winter
Hans-Arwed Weidenmüller
Hans-Dieter Betz
Hans-Hermann Hupfeld
Hans-Joachim Queisser
Hans-Peter Dürr
Hans Albert Einstein
Hans Benndorf
Hans Bethe
Hans Breuer (physicist)
Hans Christian von Baeyer
Hans Christian Ørsted
Hans Eduard Suess
Hans Ferdinand Mayer
Hans Frauenfelder
Hans G. Hornung
Hans Geiger
Hans Georg Dehmelt
Hans Grassmann
Hans Hellmann
Hans Henrik Andersen
Hans Hollmann
Hans K. Ziegler
Hans Kopfermann
Hans Kramers
Hans Kronberger (physicist)
Hans Lippershey
Hans Reissner
Hans Suess
Hans Thirring
Hans Volker Klapdor-Kleingrothaus
Hans W. Liepmann
Hans Wolter
Hans von Halban
Hans von Ohain
Hansjoerg Dittus
Hantaro Nagaoka
Harald Herborg Nielsen
Harald Keres
Harald Lesch
Harald Schering
Harald Wergeland
Hard radiation
Hard spheres
Harlan True Stetson
Harley Rutledge
Harmonic
Harmonic coordinate condition
Harmonic oscillator
Harmonic superspace
Harmonices Mundi
Harold A. Wilson (physicist)
Harold Agnew
Harold E. Johns
Harold E. Puthoff
Harold Furth
Harold Hopkins
Harold Jeffreys
Harold L. Brode
Harold Max Rosenberg
Harold McCarter Taylor
Harold McMaster
Harold Neville Vazeille Temperley
Harold R. Kaufman
Harold Warris Thompson
Harrie Massey
Harriet Brooks
Harris functional
Harrison Brown
Harry Boot
Harry Hammond Hess
Harry J. Lipkin
Harry Daghlian
Harry Kloor
Harry Kroger
Harry Lehmann
Harry Messel
Harry Swinney
Harry Zvi Tabor
Hartland Snyder
Hartle–Hawking state
Hartman effect
Hartmut Kallmann
Hartree
Hartree–Fock method
Harvard Project Physics
Harvard–Smithsonian Center for Astrophysics
Harvey Einbinder
Harvey Fletcher
Hasegawa–Mima equation
Hassan Aref
Hassan Jawahery
Haverah Park experiment
Havriliak–Negami relaxation
Hawking energy
Hawking radiation
Hayashi track
Hayes similitude principle
Haynes–Shockley experiment
Hazen–Williams equation
He Xiantu
Head-related transfer function
Head of tide
Head shadow
Headwind
Heat
Heat bath
Heat capacity
Heat capacity ratio
Heat current
Heat death of the universe
Heat engine
Heat equation
Heat flux
Heat generation in integrated circuits
Heat kernel
Heat loss due to linear thermal bridging
Heat of sublimation
Heat pump
Heat pump and refrigeration cycle
Heat spreader
Heat transfer
Heat transfer coefficient
Heat transmission
Heather Couper
Heather Reid
Heating pad
Heaviside condition
Heavy Rydberg system
Heavy neutrino
Heavy water
Hedwig Kohn
Heidi Jo Newberg
Heike Kamerlingh Onnes
Heim theory
Heino Finkelmann
Heinrich Barkhausen
Heinrich Bürger
Heinrich Friedrich Weber
Heinrich Geißler
Heinrich Greinacher
Heinrich Gustav Magnus
Heinrich Hertz
Heinrich Kayser
Heinrich Konen
Heinrich Lenz
Heinrich Ott (physicist)
Heinrich Rohrer
Heinrich Rubens
Heinrich Streintz
Heinrich Welker
Heinrich Wilhelm Brandes
Heinrich Wilhelm Dove
Heinrich Wilhelm Matthias Olbers
Heinrich von Wild
Heinz-Jürgen Kluge
Heinz Barwich
Heinz Kohnen
Heinz London
Heinz Maier-Leibnitz
Heinz Oberhummer
Heinz Pagels
Heinz Pose
Heisenberg's microscope
Heisenberg model (quantum)
Heisenberg picture
Heisler Chart
Hele-Shaw flow
Helen Quinn
Helen T. Edwards
Heliac
Helically Symmetric Experiment
Helicity (particle physics)
Helicity basis
Helicon (physics)
Helicon discharge
Helikon vortex separation process
Helimagnetism
Heliocentrism
Heliophysics
Helioseismology
Heliosphere
Heliospheric current sheet
Heliotron
Helium-3 refrigerator
Helium atom
Helium atom scattering
Helium flash
Helium fusion
Helium line ratio
Helium mass spectrometer
Helium planet
Helium–neon laser
Helix–coil transition model
Hellmann–Feynman theorem
Hellmut Fritzsche
Helmholtz's theorems
Helmholtz coil
Helmholtz decomposition
Helmholtz equation
Helmholtz flow
Helmholtz free energy
Helmholtz reciprocity
Helmholtz resonance
Helmholtz theorem (classical mechanics)
Helmut Gröttrup
Helmut Hönl
Helmut Volz
Helsinki Institute of Physics
Hemodynamics
Hendricus Stoof
Hendrik Casimir
Hendrik Lorentz
Hendrik Tennekes
Hendrik Wade Bode
Henri Bacry
Henri Becquerel
Henri Buisson
Henri Bénard
Henri Chrétien
Henri Daniel Rathgeber
Henri Pitot
Henri Poincaré
Henri Poincaré Prize
Henri Victor Regnault
Henrik Svensmark
Henry's law
Henry (unit)
Henry Andrews Bumstead
Henry Augustus Rowland
Henry Brose
Henry Cabourn Pocklington
Henry Cavendish
Henry Coddington
Henry Darcy
Henry DeWolf Smyth
Henry Draper Medal
Henry Duckworth
Henry Gale (astrophysicist)
Henry Gellibrand
Henry H. Barschall
Henry Hemmendinger
Henry Hurwitz, Jr.
Henry Kater
Henry Katzenstein
Henry Kolm
Henry Lipson
Henry M. Foley
Henry Margenau
Henry Minchin Noad
Henry Moseley
Henry Primakoff
Henry S. Valk
Henry Smith Carhart
Henry Stapp
Henry Tye
Henry Way Kendall
Henryk Niewodniczański
Henyey track
Heraclitus
Herbert A. Hauptman
Herbert Arthur Stuart
Herbert Callen
Herbert Dingle
Herbert E. Ives
Herbert Friedman
Herbert Fröhlich
Herbert Gleiter
Herbert Goldstein
Herbert Gursky
Herbert Huppert
Herbert Kroemer
Herbert L. Anderson
Herbert Mataré
Herbert S. Green
Herbert Walther
Herbert Wilson
Herbert York
Herbig–Haro object
Herman Branson
Herman Carr
Herman Chernoff
Herman Feshbach
Herman March
Herman Verlinde
Herman Z. Cummins
Hermann Arthur Jahn
Hermann Bondi
Hermann Brück
Hermann Glauert
Hermann Grassmann
Hermann Haken
Hermann Knoblauch
Hermann Minkowski
Hermann Oberth
Hermann Schlichting
Hermann Weyl
Hermann von Helmholtz
Hermann–Mauguin notation
Hermetic detector
Heron's fountain
Herpolhode
Herschel–Bulkley fluid
Hertha Sponer
Hertha Wambacher
Hertz
Hertzsprung gap
Hertzsprung–Russell diagram
Herwig Schopper
Hess's law
Hessel de Vries
Heteroazeotrope
Heteroclinic cycle
Heteroclinic orbit
Heterojunction
Heterojunction bipolar transistor
Heterotic string
Heusler alloy
Hexagonal crystal system
Hexagonally closed packed metal
Hexatic fluid phase
HiPER
HiVOLT
Hicks Building
Hidden sector
Hidden subgroup problem
Hidden variable theory
Hideki Yukawa
Hideo Mabuchi
Hidetsugu Ikegami
Hierarchy problem
Higgs boson
Higgs field
Higgs mechanism
Higgs phase
Higgs sector
Higgsino
High-Z Supernova Search Team
High-altitude wind power
High-efficiency hybrid cycle
High-energy X-rays
High-energy visible light
High-intensity focused ultrasound
High-κ dielectric
High-lift device
High-refractive-index polymer
High-resolution scheme
High-temperature electrolysis
High-temperature superconductivity
High Energy Stereoscopic System
High Flux Australian Reactor
High Flux Isotope Reactor
High Frequency Active Auroral Research Program
High Resolution Fly's Eye Cosmic Ray Detector
High Speed Photometer
High energy nuclear physics
High frequency
High frequency approximation
High pressure
High pressure physics
High voltage
Higher-dimensional Einstein gravity
Higher-dimensional supergravity
Higher spin alternating sign matrix
Highly charged ion
Hilbert C*-module
Hilbert space
Hilbert spectrum
Hilbrand J. Groenewold
Hilding Faxén
Hillard Bell Huntington
Hilmi Volkan Demir
Himiko (Lyman-alpha blob)
Hipot
Hippasus
HippoDraw
Hippolyte Fizeau
Hiromichi Kataura
Hiroo Kanamori
Hirosi Ooguri
Hiss (electromagnetic)
History of Lorentz transformations
History of Mars observation
History of Planck's law
History of Solar System formation and evolution hypotheses
History of X-ray astronomy
History of centrifugal and centripetal forces
History of classical mechanics
History of electrical engineering
History of electromagnetic theory
History of electrophoresis
History of entropy
History of experiments
History of fluid mechanics
History of gamma-ray burst research
History of general relativity
History of geomagnetism
History of geophysics
History of gravitational theory
History of heat
History of loop quantum gravity
History of materials science
History of metamaterials
History of nuclear weapons
History of optics
History of physics
History of quantum field theory
History of quantum mechanics
History of radio
History of special relativity
History of spectroscopy
History of string theory
History of superconductivity
History of the Big Bang theory
History of the Earth
History of the battery
History of the metre
History of the metric system
History of the periodic table
History of the transistor
History of thermodynamics
History of variational principles in physics
Hjulström curve
Hodograph
Hofmeister series
Hofstadter's butterfly
Hohlraum
Hole argument
Holevo's theorem
Holger Bech Nielsen
Hollow-cathode lamp
Hollow Earth
Holographic interferometry
Holographic principle
Holographic sensor
Holography
Holometer
Holon (physics)
Holonomic basis
Holonomic constraints
Holstein–Herring method
Holstein–Primakoff transformation
Homentropic flow
Homeokinetics
Homer Dudley
Homer L. Dodge
Homes's law
Homestake Mine (South Dakota)
Homestake experiment
Homi J. Bhabha
Homoclinic orbit
Homoeoid
Homogeneity (physics)
Homogeneity and heterogeneity
Homogeneous broadening
Homogeneous isotropic turbulence
Homologous temperature
Homotopy analysis method
Hongjie Dai
Hooke's law
Hoop Conjecture
Hopkinson's law
Horace-Bénédict de Saussure
Horace Hearne Institute
Horace Lamb
Horaţiu Năstase
Horizon (general relativity)
Horizon problem
Horizontal Falls
Horizontal plane
Hormesis
Horn antenna
Horror vacui (physics)
Horseshoe orbit
Horseshoe vortex
Horst Korsching
Horst Ludwig Störmer
Horst Stöcker
Host galaxy
Hot-carrier injection
Hot chocolate effect
Hot electron
Hot spot effect in subatomic physics
Hough function
How to Build a Time Machine
Howard A. Stone
Howard Berg
Howard Brandt
Howard Georgi
Howard Grubb
Howard H. Aiken
Howard J. Van Till
Howard M. Wiseman
Howard P. Robertson
Howard Petch
Howard Wilson Emmons
Howell Peregrine
Hoyle–Narlikar theory of gravity
Hořava–Lifshitz gravity
Hořava–Witten domain wall
Hu Jimin
Hu Ning
Huang Kun
Hubbard model
Hubble's law
Hubble Bubble (astronomy)
Hubble Deep Field
Hubble Deep Field South
Hubble Extreme Deep Field
Hubble Ultra-Deep Field
Hubble volume
Huber's equation
Hubert Chanson
Hubert Curien
Hubert Reeves
Hubert Yockey
Huchra's lens
Huemul Project
Hugh Bradner
Hugh David Politzer
Hugh E. Montgomery
Hugh Everett III
Hugh Latimer Dryden
Hugh Le Caine
Hugh Longbourne Callendar
Hugh Ross (creationist)
Hugh W. Hardy
Hughes–Drever experiment
Hugo Benioff
Hugo Christiaan Hamaker
Hugo Rietveld
Hugo Tetrode
Hull speed
Human echolocation
Humidity
Humphrey Maris
Humphreys series
Hund's rule of maximum multiplicity
Hund's rules
Hundred-year wave
Hung Cheng
Hunter Rouse
Hunter–Saxton equation
Hunting oscillation
Husimi Q representation
Huygens–Fresnel principle
Hybrid airship
Hybrid functional
Hybrid image
Hybrid solar cell
Hydraulic accumulator
Hydraulic circuit
Hydraulic cylinder
Hydraulic diameter
Hydraulic fluid
Hydraulic head
Hydraulic jump
Hydraulic jumps in rectangular channels
Hydraulic machinery
Hydraulic manifold
Hydraulics
Hydrodynamic stability
Hydrodynamical helicity
Hydrodynamics
Hydroelasticity
Hydrogen-burning process
Hydrogen-like atom
Hydrogen anion
Hydrogen atom
Hydrogen bomb
Hydrogen embrittlement
Hydrogen fluoride laser
Hydrogen ion
Hydrogen ion cluster
Hydrogen line
Hydrogen maser
Hydrogen silsesquioxane
Hydrogen spectral series
Hydrophone
Hydropower
Hydrostatic equilibrium
Hydrostatic fluid
Hydrothermal synthesis
Hydroxyl ion absorption
Hygrometer
Hyper-Kamiokande
HyperPhysics
Hyperbolic coordinates
Hyperbolic equilibrium point
Hyperbolic motion (relativity)
Hyperbolic orthogonality
Hyperbolic quaternion
Hyperbolic set
Hyperbolic trajectory
Hypercharge
Hyperchromicity
Hypercompact stellar system
Hyperelastic material
Hyperfine structure
Hypergravity
Hyperlens
Hypernetted-chain equation
Hypernova
Hypernuclei
Hypernucleus
Hyperon
Hyperplane
Hyperpolarizability
Hyperpolarization (physics)
Hyperradiant Fresnel lens
Hypersonic effect
Hypersonic speed
Hypersonic wind tunnel
Hyperspace (book)
Hyperspectral imaging
Hypertriton
Hypervelocity
Hyporheic zone
Hypotheses non fingo
Hypothetical star
Hypsochromic shift
Hypsometric equation
Hysteresis
Hysteresivity
Hélène Langevin-Joliot
Hückel method

Indexes of physics articles